An extra life is a video game item that gives the player another life.

Extra Life may also refer to:
 Extra Life (fundraiser), a fundraising event
 Extra Life (band), an experimental band from Brooklyn
 Extra Lives: Why Video Games Matter, a book by Tom Bissell